Carex eburnea, known as ivory sedge, ebony sedge, and bristleleaf or bristle-leaved sedge, is a small and slender sedge native to North America, from Alaska and Newfoundland south to central Mexico (San Luis Potosí and Querétaro).

Description

Ivory sedge is a clump-forming sedge that spreads gradually by slender, light brown rhizomes to form colonies. The bases of the leaves and culms are wrapped in a light brown sheath. The leaves dry up after the growing season and persist at least until the next spring. 

Each inflorescence (flower cluster), at the end of a culm, has one staminate (male) spike above two to three pistillate (female) spikes, each enclosed at the base by a tubular bract. There are 3 to 10 florets in each pistillate spike. The scales under the florets are white and translucent.

The stem of the inflorescence and the stems of the pistillate spikes are very short at blooming time, but lengthen a great deal by the time the seed matures, so that the clusters of achenes overtop the withered staminate spike and the stem is always longer than the leaves.

Distribution and habitat
Ivory sedge usually grows in coniferous or mixed woodlands, sometimes in fens, stable dunes, or alvar (shallow soil above limestone). It prefers sandy or gravelly soil with a neutral to alkaline pH.

References

External links
 

eburnea
Flora of North America
Flora of Subarctic America
Flora of Canada
Flora of Eastern Canada
Flora of Western Canada
Flora of the North-Central United States
Flora of the Northeastern United States
Flora of the Southeastern United States
Plants described in 1839